Mondaire L. Jones (born May 18, 1987) is an American lawyer and politician who was the U.S. representative for  from 2021 to 2023. The district includes most of central and northwestern Westchester County and all of Rockland County. A member of the Democratic Party, he and Ritchie Torres were the first openly gay Black members of Congress.

As a member of Congress, Jones was described as a rising star on the progressive wing of the Democratic Party. After redistricting, he sought reelection in 2022 in New York's 10th district after DCCC chair Sean Patrick Maloney chose to run in Jones's former district, but lost the primary to attorney Dan Goldman.

He was appointed to the United States Commission on Civil Rights on January 3, 2023.

Early life and education 
Jones was born in Nyack, New York, and grew up in Spring Valley, New York, where he was raised by a single mother, who worked multiple jobs to support him, and his grandparents. He graduated from public schools in the East Ramapo Central School District. He earned his bachelor's degree from Stanford University in 2009. After graduating from Stanford, Jones worked in the U.S. Department of Justice during the presidency of Barack Obama. He then earned his Juris Doctor from Harvard Law School in 2013.

Career 
After law school, Jones worked as a law clerk for Andrew L. Carter Jr. of the U.S. District Court for the Southern District of New York. He also worked four years for Davis Polk & Wardwell, and one year with the Westchester County Law Department. Jones also provided pro bono legal aid through The Legal Aid Society.

U.S. House of Representatives

Elections

2020 

Jones announced his candidacy for the Democratic primary to represent the 17th district against 16-term incumbent Nita Lowey. Three months after he entered the race, Lowey announced that she would not seek reelection. Jones advocated Medicare for All, the Green New Deal, and police reform.

In a crowded eight-way Democratic primary—the real contest in this heavily Democratic district—Jones defeated attorney Adam Schleifer, former Deputy Assistant Secretary of Defense Evelyn Farkas, State Senator David Carlucci, and State Assemblyman David Buchwald, among others, winning 42% of the vote. The Associated Press called the race for Jones on July 14, 2020, three weeks after the June 23 primary, the vote tabulation having been delayed because of a large number of absentee ballots due to the COVID-19 pandemic.

In the general election, Jones faced Republican nominee Maureen McArdle Schulman, a former FDNY firefighter, as well as several third-party candidates. The Associated Press called the race for Jones the day after election day. Along with Ritchie Torres from New York's 15th congressional district, Jones is one of the first gay African Americans elected to the United States House of Representatives.

2022 and aftermath 

In 2022, Jones, whose congressional district had been redrawn, ran to represent New York's 10th congressional district. The 10th district was based in Manhattan and Brooklyn and did not include any of the territory that Jones had been representing. Jones lost the primary election to Dan Goldman.

In December 2022, it was reported that Jones was planning to move to Sleepy Hollow, a village in New York's 17th congressional district, a swing district represented by Republican Mike Lawler. It has been speculated that Jones will run to represent the district in 2024.

USPS lawsuit 
On August 17, 2020, Jones filed suit in the Southern District of New York against President Donald Trump and Postmaster General Louis DeJoy to reverse recent changes made to the United States Postal Service (USPS) that affected the agency's ability to deliver mail, including absentee ballots. In an opinion piece, Jones said he sued Trump and DeJoy "for violating the Constitution in their attempts to undermine the United States Postal Service and thwart free and fair elections this November."

On September 21, 2020, U.S. District Court Judge Victor Marrero granted an injunction against the USPS that required it to restore overtime and treat all mail-in ballots as First-Class. Jones celebrated the decision, saying: "This injunction prescribes very specific, affirmative actions that the Postal Service must undertake to ensure a free and fair election, which is my constitutional right as someone who is running for office, and which is a constitutional right of everyone in this country who is eligible to vote."

Tenure
Jones was one of two African-American LGBT members of the 117th United States Congress, along with New York's Ritchie Torres.

Jones voted to certify the 2020 United States presidential election and later voted to impeach during Trump's second impeachment. He and Ted Lieu cowrote a letter to the Attorney Grievance Committee of the New York State Supreme Court-Appellate Division asking for Rudy Giuliani to be disbarred due to his role in the January 6 United States Capitol attack.

Jones successfully lobbied U.S. Immigration and Customs Enforcement to halt the deportation of Paul Pierrilus, who was scheduled to be the last person to be deported during the Trump administration. Pierrilus, a constituent of Jones's, was to be deported to Haiti, a country he had never been to, before Jones intervened.

Jones voted for the American Rescue Plan, the PRO Act, Equality Act, For the People Act, George Floyd Justice in Policing Act, and the Bipartisan Background Checks Act.

Jones, Senator Ed Markey, Representative Hank Johnson, and House Judiciary chair Jerry Nadler pushed for an expansion of the Supreme Court from 9 seats to 13. Around the same time, Jones called for a "Third Reconstruction" in a Washington Post opinion piece.

Committee assignments 
House Democratic Steering and Policy Committee
House Judiciary Committee
Subcommittee on Antitrust, Commercial and Administrative Law 
Subcommittee on Courts, Intellectual Property and the Internet
House Committee on Education and Labor
Subcommittee on Workforce Protections
Subcommittee on Higher Education and Workforce Investment
House Committee on Ethics

Caucus memberships 
Congressional Progressive Caucus
Congressional Black Caucus
Congressional LGBT Equality Caucus (co-chair)

Personal life 
Jones came out as gay when he was 24. He is a member of the First Baptist Church of Spring Valley.

In June 2020, in honor of the 50th anniversary of the first gay Pride parade, Queerty named Jones among the 50 heroes "leading the nation toward equality, acceptance, and dignity for all people."

Electoral history

2020

2022

See also
 List of African-American United States representatives
 List of LGBT members of the United States Congress

References

External links

|-

1987 births
20th-century African-American people
21st-century African-American politicians
21st-century American lawyers
21st-century American politicians
African-American lawyers
African-American members of the United States House of Representatives
African-American people in New York (state) politics
American community activists
Baptists from New York (state)
Candidates in the 2020 United States elections
Democratic Party members of the United States House of Representatives from New York (state)
Gay politicians
Harvard Law School alumni
LGBT African Americans
LGBT lawyers
LGBT members of the United States Congress
LGBT people from New York (state)
LGBT Baptists
Living people
New York (state) lawyers
People from Nyack, New York
People from Spring Valley, New York
Stanford University alumni